The Mocking Program is a science fiction novel by American author Alan Dean Foster, published in 2002.

Plot

A hard-boiled police procedural set in a megalopolis called the Montezuma Strip, which stretches along the old U.S.-Mexican border. When police inspector Angel Cardenas investigates the case of a male corpse found with most of its internal organs missing, the victim turns out to have had two identities - one as a local executive, the other as a Texas businessman. The plot thickens when the victim's booby-trapped house nearly kills Cardenas and his partner. The author makes use of a vast array of futuristic elements; notably, sapient apes led by gorillas and intelligent rogue computers that commit computer crimes.

While the book does not state this, this is a continuation of a series of short stories featuring the same main character, written by Foster and initially published in genre magazines under the pen-name of James Lawson,  and then collected under his own name in the Warner book Montezuma Strip (1995).

2002 American novels
American science fiction novels
Novels by Alan Dean Foster
Techno-thriller novels